The 1965 Major League Baseball Draft is the first year in which a draft took place for Major League Baseball. It was held on June 8–9 in New York City.

In Major League Baseball's first Free Agent Amateur Draft, the Kansas City Athletics selected Arizona State sophomore Rick Monday as the number one pick. Kansas City also chose ten future major leaguers, including Sal Bando (6th round) and Gene Tenace (20th round), building the base for the Oakland Athletics' championship teams of the early 1970s.

A total of 813 players were selected. Some of the more significant picks were catcher Johnny Bench by the Cincinnati Reds in the second round, pitcher Nolan Ryan by the New York Mets in the twelfth round, and infielder Graig Nettles by the Minnesota Twins in the fourth round. The first player to reach the majors was pitcher Joe Coleman, the Washington Senators' first pick and third pick overall. Future Hall of Famer Tom Seaver was selected by the Los Angeles Dodgers in the 10th round but did not sign and returned to the University of Southern California campus.

Key

First round selections

Post-first round selections
The list of later selections is limited to those who have made at least one major league appearance.

References

External links
Complete draft list from The Baseball Cube database

Major League Baseball draft
Draft
Major League Baseball draft
Major League Baseball draft
Baseball in New York City
Sporting events in New York City